Ingimundr, Ingimundur, Ingimund, and Ingemund may refer to:

Assassination of Ingimundr, the death of a Norwegian claimant to the Kingdom of the Isles
Ingemund Bengtsson (1919–2000), Swedish politician
Ingemund Fænn (1907–1987), Norwegian newspaper editor
Ingimundr (tenth century), Norse warlord in the Irish Sea region
Ingimundur Ingimundarson (born 1980), Icelandic athlete